Thomas Chamberlayne, D.D was Dean of Bristol from 1739 to 1757.

References

18th-century English Anglican priests
Deans of Bristol
Year of birth missing
Year of death missing